Gary Carr may refer to:
 Gary Carr (politician) (born 1955), politician in Ontario, Canada
 Gary Carr (actor) (born 1986), English actor, dancer and musician
 Gary Carr (video game developer), an English video game developer